The 10th annual Berlin International Film Festival was held from 24 June to 5 July 1960. The Golden Bear was awarded to the Spanish film El Lazarillo de Tormes directed by César Fernández Ardavín.

Jury

The following people were announced as being on the jury for the festival:

International feature film jury
 Harold Lloyd, actor, director and producer (United States) - Jury President
 Georges Auric, composer (France)
 Henry Reed, composer (United Kingdom)
 Sohrab Modi, actor, director and producer (India)
 Floris Luigi Ammannati, director of the Venice Film Festival (Italy)
 Hidemi Ima, director (Japan)
 Joaquín de Entrambasaguas, philologist and historiographer (Spain)
 Frank Wisbar, director and screenwriter (West Germany)
 Georg Ramseger, writer (West Germany)
 Werner R. Heymann, composer (West Germany)
 Eva Staar (West Germany)

International documentary and short jury
 Johannes Eckardt, film curator (West Germany) - Jury President
 Tahar Cheriaa, founder of the Carthage Film Days (Tunisia)
 Ludwig Gesek, writer and film historian (Austria)
 Lars Krantz, television producer (Sweden)
 Edwin Redslob, art historian (West Germany)
 Roberto Alejandro Tálice, journalist, film critic and playwright (Argentina)
 Semih Tuğrul, writer (Turkey)

Films in competition
The following films were in competition for the Golden Bear award:

Key
{| class="wikitable" width="550" colspan="1"
| style="background:#FFDEAD;" align="center"| †
|Winner of the main award for best film in its section
|}

Awards
The following prizes were awarded by the Jury:

International jury awards
 Golden Bear: El Lazarillo de Tormes by César Fernández Ardavín
 Silver Bear for Best Director: Jean-Luc Godard for À bout de souffle
 Silver Bear for Best Actress: Juliette Mayniel for Kirmes
 Silver Bear for Best Actor: Fredric March for Inherit the Wind
 Silver Bear Extraordinary Jury Prize: Les Jeux de l'amour by Philippe de Broca

Documentaries and short films jury awards
 Golden Bear (Documentaries): Faja lobbi by Herman van der Horst
 Honorable mention (Documentaries): Mandara by René Gardi
 Short Film Golden Bear: Le songe des chevaux sauvages Denys Colomb de Daunant
 Silver Bear for Best Short Film: ex aequoDer Spielverderber by Ferdinand Diehl and Boris von BorresholmI vecchi by Raffaele AndreassiDiario by Juan Berend
 Silver Bear Extraordinary Jury Prize (Short film): Hest på sommerferie by Astrid Henning-Jensen
 Honorable mention (Short Film): Austria Gloriosa by Edmund von Hammer and Hafenrhythmus by Wolf Hart

Independent jury awards
FIPRESCI Award
The Angry Silence by Guy Green
OCIC Award
The Angry Silence by Guy Green
C.I.D.A.L.C. Award
El Lazarillo de Tormes by César Fernández Ardavín

Youth Film Award  (Jugendfilmpreis):
Best Feature Film Suitable for Young People: Inherit the Wind by Stanley Kramer
Honorable Mention: The Angry Silence by Guy Green
Best Documentary Film Suitable for Young People: Jungle Cat by James Algar
Honorable Mention: Mandara by René Gardi
Best Short Film Suitable for Young People: Người con của biển cả (unknown director)
Honorable Mention: Ballon vole by Jean Dasque

References

External links
 10th Berlin International Film Festival 1960
 1960 Berlin International Film Festival
 Berlin International Film Festival:1960  at Internet Movie Database

10
1960 film festivals
1960 in West Germany
1960s in West Berlin